Dan Gibson may refer to:
 Daniel Z. Gibson (1908–1984), American academic and academic administrator
Dan Gibson (1922–2006), Canadian photographer, cinematographer and sound recordist
Daniel Gibson (born 1986), American former basketball player
Daniel Gibson (presenter) (born 1972), Australian television presenter
Dan Gibson (author) specialising in Nabataean and early Islamic history
Daniel Gibson (politician), member of the South Carolina House of Representatives

See also
Don Gibson (disambiguation)